

Walter Keiner (30 December 1890 – 23 January 1978) was a general in the Wehrmacht of Nazi Germany during World War II. He was a recipient of the Knight's Cross of the Iron Cross.

Awards and decorations

 Knight's Cross of the Iron Cross on 17 July 1941 as Generalleutnant and commander of 62. Infanterie-Division

References

Citations

Bibliography

 

1890s births
1978 deaths
German Army generals of World War II
Generals of Artillery (Wehrmacht)
German Army personnel of World War I
Recipients of the Knight's Cross of the Iron Cross
German prisoners of war in World War II
People from Schmalkalden-Meiningen
People from Saxe-Meiningen
Recipients of the clasp to the Iron Cross, 1st class
Military personnel from Thuringia